Kazbegi National Park is in Kazbegi Municipality in the Mtskheta-Mtianeti region of north-eastern Georgia.

Kazbegi National Park is a popular tourist destination despite the lack of basic tourism infrastructure.

Historical monuments worth a visit are the fourteenth-century Sameba temple, the tenth-century Garbanikerk, the Sioni basilica, the Akhaltsikhe basilica and the seventeenth-century Sno Castle.  In the area one finds a mix of Christian and pagan customs.

See also 
List of protected areas of Georgia

References

National parks of Georgia (country)
Protected areas established in 1976
1976 establishments in the Soviet Union